Heaven & Earth is a 2007 South Korean television series starring Park Hae-jin, Han Hyo-joo, Lee Joo-hyun, Kang Jung-hwa, and Hong Soo-ah. It aired on KBS1 from January 15 to August 31, 2007 on Mondays to Fridays at 20:25 for 165 episodes.

The daily drama was a hit, maintaining an average viewership rating of 30% throughout its nine-month run. Its peak viewership rating of 36.1% (on episode 164) made it the third highest-rated Korean drama of 2007.

Plot
Jung Mu-young (Park Hae-jin) was left by his birth-mother under the care of Kim Tae-shik (Jung Han-yong) and his wife Park Myung-ja (Jung Ae-ri) when he was very young. His mother promised to come after him later but she never did. The Kim family raised Mu-young like he was their own son but never changed his family name because they thought his birth-mother might later come to pick him up. Despite a lack of money, Myung-ja has managed to keep the family together; moreover, she never once treated Mu-young any differently than her biological son, still having a different family name with his older brother Kim Sang-hyun (Lee Joo-hyun) made him escape home several times. Mu-young is outwardly rebellious, unforgiving, and in constant conflict with his family; he keeps an emotional distance from them, for fear of getting hurt one day. At school he meets the cheerful and kindhearted Seok Ji-soo (Han Hyo-joo), who not only values her family greatly, but goes out of her way to help others. Thinking too highly of Ji Soo and too low of himself and aware of the possible negative reaction her family might have toward his confession to her, he tries making a distance between himself and Ji Soo.

As a grown up, Ji-soo begins working for Myung-ja's stepsister Park Myung-joo (Yoon Hae-young), and learns that she and her single father Seok Jong-hoon (Hong Yo-seob) are in love and she fully supports her father's newfound romance. She is also seeing a rich family's son who wants to propose to her.

Heaven & Earth tackles the issues the modern family faces, such as the difficulties faced by stepparents and stepchildren; conflicts between biological and adoptive parents; the aftermath of a remarriage; and the high divorce rate among the younger generation, and resulting involuntary childcare from their grandparents.

Cast

Main cast
Park Hae-jin as Jung Mu-young
Han Hyo-joo as Seok Ji-soo
Kang Jung-hwa as Yoon Eun-joo
Lee Joo-hyun as Kim Sang-hyun
Hong Soo-ah as Yoon Eun-ha

Supporting cast
Kim family
Jung Han-yong as Kim Tae-shik, Sang-hyun and Mu-young's father
Jung Ae-ri as Park Myung-ja, Sang-hyun's mother
Ban Hyo-jung as Han Bong-rye, Myung-ja's mother
Jung Jae-soon as Lee Soon-im, Myung-ja's stepmother
Yoon Hae-young as Park Myung-joo, Soon-im's daughter
Kim Il-woo as Park Myung-tae, Myung-ja's younger brother

Seok family
Hong Yo-seob as Seok Jong-hoon, Ji-soo's father
Seo Jae-kyung as Seok Ji-woong, Ji-soo's older brother
Kang Rae-yeon as Se Mi-ae, Ji-woong's wife

Yoon family
Jung Dong-hwan as Yoon Jae-doo, Eun-joo and Eun-ha's father
Kim Ja-ok as Ahn Hye-kyung, Eun-joo and Eun-ha's mother

Extended cast
Choi Won-young as Jang Young-min
Han Jin-hee as President Jang, Young-min's father
Seo Jun-young as Song Ji-min
Lee Hye-sook as Jin-sook
Park Hyo-bin
Han Young-kwang

Awards
2007 KBS Drama Awards 
Excellence Award, Actor in a Serial Drama: Park Hae-jin
Popularity Award: Han Hyo-joo
Best Couple Award: Park Hae-jin and Han Hyo-joo

References

External links

Korean Broadcasting System television dramas
2007 South Korean television series debuts
South Korean romance television series